Robert Hall Smith (March 10, 1888 – June 18, 1960), a native of Baltimore, Maryland, served as President of the Norfolk and Western Railway (N&W) from 1946 to 1958. He was first employed on the N&W during the summer of 1910 as an axeman and chainman on a surveying crew. After graduating Phi Beta Kappa from Princeton University in 1911, he returned to the N&W where he remained until his retirement.

Smith was named Vice President Operations in 1941. He succeeded William J. Jenks as president in 1946.

Smith was a proponent of steam motive power during his tenure as president. He authorized operating tests in 1952 to compare General Motors Electro-Motive Division diesel locomotives with two N&W-designed and -built steam locomotives. He also supported the experimental coal-burning, steam-turbine electric locomotive, Jawn Henry, which the Railway tested from 1954 to 1957.

Smith retired from the N&W on March 31, 1958, and was succeeded by Stuart T. Saunders.

His nickname "Racehorse" came from his long stride and rapid pace. The story goes that once when offered a ride to his office he declined saying that he was in a hurry.

References
 

1888 births
1960 deaths
Princeton University alumni
20th-century American railroad executives